The ochraceous-breasted flycatcher (Nephelomyias ochraceiventris) is a species of bird in the family Tyrannidae found in Bolivia and Peru. Its natural habitats are subtropical or tropical moist montane forests.

References

ochraceous-breasted flycatcher
Birds of the Puna grassland
ochraceous-breasted flycatcher
Taxonomy articles created by Polbot